Across the Great Divide is a box set by Canadian-American rock group the Band. Released in 1994, it consists of two discs of songs from the Band's first seven albums, and a third disc of rarities taken from various studio sessions and live performances. The set is now out of print, having been replaced by the five-CD/one-DVD box set A Musical History that was released in September 2005.

Track listing
All songs written by Robbie Robertson, unless otherwise noted.

Disc one
Tracks 1–7 from Music from Big Pink (1968). Tracks 8–15 from The Band (1969). Tracks 16–19 from Stage Fright (1970).
 "Tears of Rage" (Bob Dylan, Richard Manuel) – 5:19
 "The Weight" – 4:35
 "I Shall Be Released" (Dylan) – 3:12
 "Chest Fever" – 5:13
 "In a Station" (Manuel) – 3:30
 "To Kingdom Come" – 3:19
 "Lonesome Suzie" (Manuel) – 4:01
 "Rag Mama Rag" – 3:03
 "The Night They Drove Old Dixie Down" – 3:31
 "King Harvest (Has Surely Come)" – 3:38
 "Rockin' Chair" – 3:39
 "Whispering Pines" (Manuel, Robertson) – 3:56
 "Up on Cripple Creek" – 4:31
 "Across the Great Divide" – 2:54
 "The Unfaithful Servant" – 4:16
 "The Shape I'm In" – 4:01
 "Daniel and the Sacred Harp" – 4:13
 "All La Glory" – 3:34
 "Stage Fright" – 3:44

Disc two
Tracks 1–4 from Cahoots (1971). Tracks 5–9 from Rock of Ages (1972). Tracks 10–11 from Moondog Matinee (1973). Tracks 12–14 from Northern Lights – Southern Cross (1975). Tracks 15–17 from Islands (1977).
 "When I Paint My Masterpiece" (Dylan) – 4:18
 "The Moon Struck One" – 4:08
 "Life Is a Carnival" (Rick Danko, Levon Helm, Robertson) – 3:57
 "The River Hymn" – 4:37
 "Don't Do It" (Holland–Dozier–Holland) – 4:42
 "Caledonia Mission" – 3:21
 "The W.S. Walcott Medicine Show" – 3:52
 "Get Up Jake" – 3:16
 "This Wheel's on Fire" (Danko, Dylan) – 3:54
 "Share Your Love with Me" (Deadric Malone, Alfred Braggs) – 2:54
 "Mystery Train" (H. Parker Jr., Sam Phillips, additional lyrics by Robertson) – 5:40
 "Acadian Driftwood" – 6:40
 "Ophelia" – 3:29
 "It Makes No Difference" – 6:32
 "Livin' in a Dream" – 2:50
 "The Saga of Pepote Rouge" – 4:13
 "Right as Rain" – 3:54

Disc three
 "Who Do You Love?" (Bo Diddley) – 2:40
by Ronnie Hawkins & the Hawks, released March 1963
 "Do the Honky Tonk" (Don Robey) – 2:58
by Levon & the Hawks, recorded live in 1964, previously unreleased
 "He Don't Love You" – 2:36
by Levon & the Hawks, released 1964
 "Katie's Been Gone" (Manuel, Robertson) – 2:46
from The Basement Tapes (1975)
 "Bessie Smith" (Danko, Robertson) – 4:18
from The Basement Tapes
 "Orange Juice Blues (Blues for Breakfast)" (Manuel) – 3:18
Previously unreleased demo
 "Ain't No Cane on the Brazos" (Traditional, arr. by Danko, Helm, Garth Hudson, Manuel, Robertson) – 4:26
Recorded live 1969 at the Woodstock Festival, previously unreleased
 "Slippin' and Slidin' (Richard Penniman) – 3:13
Recorded live 1970 Syria Mosque Pittsburgh, Pennsylvania, previously unreleased
 "Twilight" – 3:15
from The Best of the Band (1976)
 "Back to Memphis" (Chuck Berry) – 5:58
 "Too Wet to Work" (Garth Hudson) – 2:30
Performed by Garth Hudson solo, during thundershower
 "Loving You Is Sweeter Than Ever" (Stevie Wonder, Ivy Jo Hunter) – 3:25
 "Don't Ya Tell Henry" (Dylan) – 3:23
 "Endless Highway" – 5:09
Tracks 10–14 from Live at Watkins Glen (1995)
 "She Knows" (Jimmy Griffin, Robb Royer) – 3:22
Credited to Richard Manuel; Rick Danko and Garth Hudson also perform
Recorded live 1986 at the Lone Star Cafe in New York City, New York, previously unreleased
 "Evangeline" – 3:11 (with Emmylou Harris)
 "Out of the Blue" – 3:11
 "The Weight" – 4:35 (with The Staple Singers)
 "The Last Waltz Refrain" – 1:31
 "Theme from The Last Waltz" – 3:26
Tracks 16–20 from The Last Waltz (1978)

Personnel
Rick Danko – bass, rhythm guitar, fiddle, trombone, vocals
Levon Helm – drums, mandolin, rhythm guitar, bass, percussion, vocals
Garth Hudson – organ, piano, synthesizers, clavinet, accordion, wind instruments
Richard Manuel – piano, organ, drums, clavinet, harmonica, baritone saxophone, dobro, vocals
Robbie Robertson – guitars, autoharp, vocals

Producers
The Band – producers (disc one, tracks 16–19, disc two, tracks 1–17 and disc three tracks 2, 4–5, 8–14)
John Simon – producer (disc one, tracks 1–15)
Robbie Robertson – producer (disc three, tracks 16–20)
Henry Glover – producer (disc three, track 1)
Eddie Heller – producer (disc three, track 3)
Albert Grossman – producer (disc three, track 6)
Eric Blackstead – producer (disc three, track 7)
Garth Hudson – producer (disc three, track 15)
See individual albums for engineering credits.

Other participants
John Simon – electric piano, tuba, baritone horn and tenor saxophone on disc one, tracks 1, 4, 8, 10, 14–15, string arrangements on "Theme from The Last Waltz"
Allen Toussaint – horn arrangements on "Life Is a Carnival", "Don't Do It", "Caledonia Mission" and "The W.S. Walcott Medicine Show"
Billy Mundi – drums on "Mystery Train"
Byron Berline – fiddle on "Acadian Driftwood"
Ronnie Hawkins – vocals on "Who Do You Love"
Roy Buchanan – bass on "Who Do You Love"
Jerry Penfound – tenor saxophone on "Do the Honky Tonk"
Larry Packer – violin and viola on "She Knows"
Frank Luther – string bass on "She Knows"
Jason Myles – harp emulation and programming on "She Knows"
Emmylou Harris – guitar and vocals on "Evangeline"
Roebuck "Pops" Staples – guitar and vocals on "The Weight" (disc three)
Mavis Staples – vocals on "The Weight" (disc three)
Cleotha and Yvonne Staples – harmony vocals on "The Weight" (disc three)

References

1994 compilation albums
Albums produced by John Simon (record producer)
Capitol Records compilation albums
The Band compilation albums